Paul Caddick (born July 1950) is a British businessman who is the founder of Caddick Group, a civil engineering business established in 1979, and Moda Living, a property development company. He is currently the director of 119 companies.

Early life
Paul Caddick is the son of a miner.

Career
Cadddick worked for West Yorkshire County Council, John Laing and the civil engineers Sir Lindsay Parkinson, before starting his own business in 1980.

In 1997, he and Gary Hetherington purchased Leeds Rhinos rugby team, and they co-founded Leeds Rugby Limited. He is also the owner, via Caddick Group's majority stake in Leeds Rhinos, of the Headingley rugby ground.

See also

List of Super League rugby league club owners
List of owners of English football clubs
List of professional sports team owners

References

1950 births
Living people
British businesspeople
Rugby league chairmen and investors
Leeds Rhinos